Acid test or acid tests may refer to:

Scientific or metallurgical test
Acid test (gold), a chemical or metallurgical test that uses acid, now also a general term for verified, approved, or tested in a large number of fields
Acid test, within a petrocalcic horizon, the use of hydrochloric acid to test rock or soil for carbonates
In the classification of a rock's lithology, dilute hydrochloric acid may be used to detect the presence of carbonate minerals

Art, entertainment, and media
Bands
Acid Test (band), a Canadian alternative rock band
ACID-TEST, a Japanese band headed by singer Kazutoshi Sakurai
Other uses
"Acid Test", a song by Emma Pollock from her album Watch the Fireworks (2007)
"The Acid Test", a science quiz from 1994 to 1997 on BBC Five Live, hosted by Kate Bellingham

Business
Quick ratio, also known as acid-test ratio or acid-test liquidity ratio, a measure of a company's cash liquidity

Computing and technology
Acid1, Acid2 and Acid3, test suites for web browsers
ACID (atomicity, consistency, isolation, durability) is set of properties of database transactions intended to guarantee validity even in the event of errors

Other uses
The Acid Tests, parties conducted by the Merry Pranksters, centered on the use of LSD (acid)

See also
Acid (disambiguation)
Litmus (disambiguation)